In cricket, a five-wicket haul (also known as a "five–for" or "fifer") occurs when a bowler takes five or more wickets in a single innings. This is regarded by critics as a notable achievement, equivalent to a century from a batsman.

Taking a five-wicket haul at Lord's earns the bowler a place on the Lord's honours boards.

Records

As of 2022, only eleven cricketers have taken a five-wicket haul in all three international formats of the game (Test cricket, One Day International and Twenty20 International): Sri Lankan's Ajantha Mendis and Lasith Malinga, Indian's Bhuvneshwar Kumar and Kuldeep Yadav, New Zealander Tim Southee, South African's Imran Tahir and Lungi Ngidi, Bangladeshi Shakib Al Hasan, Pakistani Umar Gul, West Indian Jason Holder. and Afghan Rashid Khan.

In 2018, Afghan cricketer Mujeeb Zadran, aged 16, became the youngest bowler to take a five-wicket haul in an ODI. In 2019, Pakistani cricketer Naseem Shah, also aged 16, became the youngest bowler to take a five-wicket haul in a Test match. Afghan cricketer Rashid Khan is the youngest bowler to take a five-wicket haul in a T20 international match; he was 18 at the time.

Sri Lankan Muttiah Muralitharan has taken the most five-wicket hauls in Test matches with 67, and Pakistani Waqar Younis has taken the most five-wicket hauls in ODIs with 13. The record for most five-wicket hauls in T20Is is two, which has been achieved by seven cricketers.

See also
List of cricketers with five-wicket hauls in all international formats
:Category:Lists of international cricket five-wicket hauls
Ten-wicket haul

References

Cricket terminology
Cricket records and statistics
Bowling (cricket)